Ronald Leslie Blackney (23 April 1933 – 14 June 2008) was an Australian middle-distance runner. He competed in the men's 3000 metres steeplechase at the 1956 Summer Olympics.

References

1933 births
2008 deaths
Athletes (track and field) at the 1956 Summer Olympics
Australian male middle-distance runners
Australian male steeplechase runners
Olympic athletes of Australia
Place of birth missing
Commonwealth Games medallists in athletics
Commonwealth Games bronze medallists for Australia
Athletes (track and field) at the 1962 British Empire and Commonwealth Games
Medallists at the 1962 British Empire and Commonwealth Games